"Give Me Something" is a 1980 song by Yoko Ono.

Give Me Something may also refer to:

"Give Me Something" (David Guetta song), 2002
"Give Me Something" (Jarryd James song), 2015
"Give Me Something", a song by Emeli Sandé from the 2016 album Long Live the Angels

See also
You Give Me Something (disambiguation)